Killing Time is the first album by the British singer Tina Cousins. Released in the United Kingdom on 12 July 1999, it was produced by Pete Waterman with co-production by Mark Topham and Karl Twigg.

The album contained the song "Pray", which was released in the United States soon after its rapid success in both the United Kingdom and Australia. However, the single did not make an impact on American radio until late 2006, when it was added to the music databases of a few rhythmic/dance format stations. The album also contained the singles "Killin' Time", "Forever", "Angel" and "Nothing to Fear" which, like "Pray", only became popular in 2005 and 2006, after their release.

Track listing
 "Killin' Time"
 "Pray"
 "Angel"
 "Live and Breathe"
 "Forever"
 "Breathless"
 "Nothing to Fear"
 "Turn Back Time"
 "The Fool Is Me"
 "Until the Day"
 "Mysterious Times"
 "Killin' Time (Under Influence Mix)" – tour edition bonus track
 "Forever (W.I.P. Manana Mix)" – tour edition bonus track
 "Pray (W.I.P. in the Church Mix)" – tour edition bonus track
 "Angel (W.I.P. Mix)" – tour edition bonus track
 "Killin' Time (Nelson's Filthy Dub)" – tour edition bonus track

Charts

References

1999 debut albums
Tina Cousins albums